Ananda Vikatan Cinema Awards is an annual awards ceremony for people in the Tamil film industry. It is presented by the Tamil language weekly magazine ananda vikatan. The awards were introduced in the year 2008, honouring the films that were released in 2007. The ceremony's main broadcaster is Sun TV.

Main awards

Best film

Best director

Best actor

Best actress

Best supporting actor

Best supporting actress

Best screenplay

Best dialogue

Best comedian – male

Best comedian – female

Best cinematographer

Best editor

Best art direction

Best music director

Best playback singer – male

Best playback singer – female

Best lyricist

Best costume designer

Best makeup artist

Best choreographer

Best stunt director

Best production

Awards introduced in subsequent ceremonies

Best debut director

Best debut actor

Best debut actress

Best story

Best child artist

Best villain – male

Best Villain – female

Best animation and visual effects

Most popular film

Best Wholesome Entertainer

Best Crew

S. S. Vasan lifetime achievement award

References

External links
 Ananda Vikatan Cinema Awards on YouTube
Ananda Vikatan Cinema Awards Official Website.

Indian film awards
Recurring events established in 2007
Awards established in 2007
Tamil cinema
Tamil film awards
2007 establishments in Tamil Nadu